Bede Polding College is an independent Roman Catholic co-educational secondary day school, located in South Windsor, on the north-western outskirts of Sydney, New South Wales, Australia. The school delivers a religious and secular education to approximately 1,200 students from Year 7 to Year 12.

The school is administered by the Catholic Education Office of the Diocese of Parramatta and serves the greater Hawkesbury region and the parishes of St Matthew's, Windsor and Richmond. The school opened in 1986 with 110 pupils and a staff of nine.

The school's patron is John Bede Polding, the inaugural Catholic bishop of Sydney in the Colony of New South Wales.

The college was subject to a devastating fire in late 2003 that resulted in extensive damage to the administration building and teacher study areas.

Notable alumni
 John Allen, teacher, rugby player and cricketer
 Peter Forrest, cricket player
 Naomi Stalenberg, cricket player
 Chris Brooks, guitarist and author
 Joe Avati, comedian

See also

 List of non-government schools in New South Wales
 List of Catholic schools in New South Wales
 Catholic education in Australia

References 

Catholic secondary schools in Sydney
Windsor, New South Wales
1986 establishments in Australia
Educational institutions established in 1986
Roman Catholic Diocese of Parramatta